The Union of Autonomous Trade Unions of Croatia (SSSH) is recognized as the principal voice of Croatian trade unionism. It was founded in May 1990, and represents around 1/5 of organized workers in the country. It has 18 affiliated industrial unions.

The SSSH is affiliated to the European Trade Union Confederation and the International Trade Union Confederation.

External links
www.sssh.hr

References

Trade unions in Croatia
International Trade Union Confederation
European Trade Union Confederation
Trade unions established in 1990